Fábio "Fabinho" da Silva Alves (born June 11, 1986 in Vitória), is a Brazilian striker who currently plays for Tupynambás.

References

External links
 
 Fabinho Alves at ZeroZero

1986 births
Living people
Brazilian footballers
Brazilian expatriate footballers
Campeonato Brasileiro Série A players
Campeonato Brasileiro Série B players
Campeonato Brasileiro Série C players
Campeonato Brasileiro Série D players
Cruzeiro Esporte Clube players
Villa Nova Atlético Clube players
Associação Desportiva Cabofriense players
Ipatinga Futebol Clube players
Al-Arabi SC (Kuwait) players
Nacional Esporte Clube (MG) players
Bangu Atlético Clube players
Tupi Football Club players
Associação Chapecoense de Futebol players
ABC Futebol Clube players
Paysandu Sport Club players
Joinville Esporte Clube players
Criciúma Esporte Clube players
Volta Redonda FC players
Santa Cruz Futebol Clube players
América Futebol Clube (RN) players
Tupynambás Futebol Clube players
Sertãozinho Futebol Clube players
Association football forwards
Brazilian expatriate sportspeople in Kuwait
Expatriate footballers in Kuwait
Kuwait Premier League players